The Volvo 440 and 460 are versions of a small family car produced by the Swedish manufacturer Volvo between June 1988 and September 1996. The 440 was a five-door hatchback and the 460 a four-door saloon which followed in 1989. They were built at the NedCar factory in Born, the Netherlands and were only offered with front-wheel drive.

They shared many components with the earlier Volvo 480 coupé, including floorpan, front and rear suspension, engines from Renault, transmissions, and braking systems.

Design and styling

The Volvo 440/460 Series models were designed to fit in below Volvo's bigger saloon and estate cars as a replacement to the 340/360 Series, to compete with the likes of the Ford Sierra.

Development of the 440/460/480 started in 1978, as part of the "Galaxy Project" which was to create two lines of front-wheel drive cars to replace the 300- and 200-series. The smaller line was called G1, while the larger G2 was to become the new Volvo 850. The first G1 mule, designed by Jan Wilsgaard and called the G4, was completed in September 1980 and looked largely identical to the finished Volvo 440. The G1 project was split into three branches, the G13 becoming the 480, the G14 the 460, and the G15 the 440. In 1982, the entire project was sold by Volvo to Volvo Car B.V. in the Netherlands (the successor company to DAF), who started work on the 480 coupé version. As was Volvo's tradition, a new line of cars was always introduced with the most expensive and lowest selling model first, allowing Volvo time to iron out any problems before starting volume production.

The 480 had a lot of problems in its first year of production, and the Dutch office did not have the manpower to complete the G15 (440). A lot of the work was thus subcontracted to two English companies. With the project being shifted to the Netherlands, then partially shifted to England, and further held up by the troubled gestation and initial production of the 480, the 440 looked rather dated by the time it was introduced. While the actual design is credited to Peter van Kuilenburg, Gothenburg had laid down a lot of design provisions since this was to be a volume product for the company, and the final result looked near identical to Wilsgaard's 1980 design. A station wagon was never offered, to avoid competing directly with the larger 240 and 740 wagons. This did not stop independent suppliers ASC and Heuliez from designing station wagon models and presenting them to Volvo, while the Dutch company Toncar sold a bolt-on conversion which replaced the 440's tailgate with an add-on station wagon structure.

First generation 400 series cars resemble the bigger 940, whilst the facelifted example bore a resemblance to the Volvo 850 to increase sales. The interiors of the 400-series variants were designed by famed British Volvo designer Peter Horbury.

Safety 
Safety has always been an issue of primary importance to Volvo, who have developed many features since adopted widely throughout the car industry. Crumple zones were carried on from the previous 300 series into the design of 400 series cars, aided by additional airbags both for passenger and front driver.

Other safety items included a high level brake light; a 'bulb blown' warning system; 'door open' warning light; adjustable seat belts with pretensioners and a seatbelt reminder/warning light: all of which all came as standard on all models throughout the range.

Safety was further improved on models from 1993 onward with the introduction of Side Impact Protection System (or SIPS). This was virtually unheard of at the time, and was provided (again as standard) by the forerunner of the SIPS system used on all modern Volvo cars. United Kingdom models also included daytime running lights as standard, although these could be disabled by the dealer at the owner's request.

The original advertising campaign for the 400 range centred on occupant safety. A family of crash test dummies appeared to 'survive' intact after driving the car through a plate glass office window some storeys up. Various other scenarios simulating crashes were employed in addition, all of which ended with the family walking away relatively unharmed — only to be used again in further crash tests.

Continuously Variable Transmission (CVT) option 
At launch, Volvo decided to offer a four-speed ZF conventional style automatic transmission, even as they spent a few more years redesigning the DAF-derived constantly variable transmission (CVT) to work with engines with more torque than the ones used in the Volvo 340. The majority of automatic 440/460s thus had a conventional four-speed automatic.

The CVT transmission, as fitted to the last generation 440/460 Series, used steel belts (as opposed to the rubber belts used in the 300 Series) and was known as Transmatic, although cars equipped with this auto box were marketed HTA (short for High Tech Auto).

The Transmatic differs greatly in its construction, and apart from the basic CVT principle of belts running in expanding pulleys, it has nothing in common with the Variomatic CVT used in the earlier 300 Series.

Whilst the Variomatic system was completely exposed to the elements at the rear of the car and used dry rubber belts, Transmatic was mounted transversely in the front of the car, and featured steel belts running in oil within a sealed gearbox casing. Subsequent CVT transmissions (such as Audi's Multitronic), have continued to use this configuration.

The HTA gearbox was subsequently used in Rover's Metro redesigned model (last generation) and carries the VT-1 model component number.

Standard specifications 
The specifications of most models of 440 and 460 were relatively high when compared with similarly priced alternatives. The list of options included as 'standard' grew and changed regularly throughout the lifespan of the car, varying from country to country and later also differing according to trim level. Furthermore, various 'special editions' were also introduced with equipment differing from that found as standard on all other models; making any more general comparison difficult.

Heated front seats were found across the entire range, as was a five speed gearbox; adjustable seatbelt with pre tensioners; folding two thirds split rear seats; lockable glovebox with light; and boot and ashtray lights.

Options listed as standard on later models include anti-lock brakes (ABS); traction control; front fog lights; separate reading lights for passengers in the back (located in the rear grab handles and cleverly shielded from the driver's view); Radio/cassette player with six high fidelity Blaupunkt stereo speakers; tinted UV blocking windows; Map reading lights; Graduated sun visor; Self-supporting (propless) bonnet; rear window wash/wipe; lumbar support; electric windows/mirrors; heated wing mirrors; central locking; tachometer. The driver's console on all models housed an array of warning lights, a rheostat and a lambda sensor monitor.

There were two generations of 440/460: the facelift model replaced the original model in the autumn of 1993, for the 1994 model year. Changes included a new bonnet and nose, new rear light clusters, body coloured bumpers, a different grille and numerous new options of engine, spec. level and equipment. The changes made the cars resemble the very successful Volvo 850 model more closely.

Engines 

This kind of performance put it on par with higher end 1.8 litre engines, such as the BMW 318 or 518 of the time, and equalled the performance of a host of other contemporary 2.0 litre engines.

From 1992, the engines offered were substantially different, with the range now including 1.6i, 1.8i, and 2.0i naturally aspirated petrol engines in addition to the 1.7 litre turbo option found in the mark 1 range. The 1.6 was equipped with multi point fuel injection; the 1.8 engine had single point injection, and the 2.0 came with a choice of single point and multi point injection units, the older 1.7 turbocharged version however had more power.

From 1994, the engines became slightly more powerful. Diesel versions also became available: a 1.9 litre Renault turbodiesel option (89 bhp) was offered, badged as either TD or Turbo Diesel, depending on which European market the car was sold in. Volvo also released a limited market 1.8 HTA, the "High Tech Auto", using a much improved electric belt assisted CVT auto transmission but it was short lived and not many models survive.

Trim levels 

Early cars were available in L, GL, GLE, GLEi, GLT and Turbo trims. The L and GL trim level was basic; GLE was plush and along with the GL model offered additional split seats compared to the fixed one piece rear bench on the L model; and GLT was the 'luxury' trim level. GLT and Turbo were externally similar, both featuring lowered sports suspension and a large rear spoiler. Other trim levels were gradually phased in, such as limited edition Si and Xi, and Turbo later became simply an engine variant, rather than a full trim variant.

From 1992, the range was the same for a year and a half. As a result of the facelift of 1994, the range altered drastically. Trim levels were now: base, S (which was intended as a "family" variant), Si (intended as a "sports" variant), SE ("business" variant), GLT ("performance" variant) and CD ("luxury" variant) trims. An Li model also appeared in 1994, offering base spec with the addition of power steering (and, on later models, a sunroof).

From at least 1995 onwards, all engine choices were available with all trim levels.

The later Si models and all GLT models were easily distinguishable from the rest of the range, due to the additions of sports suspension (making the car ride visibly lower) and a large rear spoiler. The GLT's specification was, however, significantly higher in featuring part leather upholstery, alloy wheels, ABS, traction control and an uprated stereo system as standard equipment.

The SE was also slightly more distinguishable, having a small rear spoiler which it shared only with the limited edition ES pack model. The ES pack could be added to cars of any engine variant from late 1995. It featured sports suspension, 15" alloy wheels, metallic paint, door sill decals, electric front windows, electric heated mirrors, front and rear armrests, ABS and immobiliser in addition to the small spoiler and an uprated stereo unit.

The S model was also notable, having two foldout child booster seats integrated into the car's rear seat, a dustbin incorporated in the dashboard and rear headrests. However unlike all the 300 Series, the 440 had, at last split rear seats fitted, though only the basic models lacked a split.

Specification of all later cars was high, with many featuring air conditioning – particularly as a result of a special offer operated by Volvo in the United Kingdom in 1995, where £100 deleted the standard electric glass sunroof from the car's specification in favour of air conditioning and 15" alloy wheels, identical to those fitted to Volvo 850 CD models, albeit with lower-profile tyres – remote central locking, electric aerial, electric windows, electric door mirrors, and heated front seats.

The line up was reduced (for example, the Si and GLT models were replaced by the GS, which had all of the Si's equipment and some of the GLT's, such as ABS) prior to production ceasing in late summer 1996, when the Volvo S40/V40, which shared its platform with the Mitsubishi Carisma, replaced the 440/460 Series.

References 

440
Cars of the Netherlands
Front-wheel-drive vehicles
1980s cars
1990s cars
Cars introduced in 1987
Vehicles with CVT transmission
VDL Nedcar vehicles
Cars discontinued in 1996